The snowy plover (Charadrius nivosus) is a small wader in the plover bird family, typically about 5-7" in length. It breeds in the southern and western United States, the Caribbean, Ecuador, Peru, and Chile. Long considered to be a subspecies of the Kentish plover, it is now known to be a distinct species.

Parts of or entire beaches along the Central California coast are protected as nesting sites for the snowy plover and completely restricted to humans. UC Santa Barbara and the Vandenberg Space Force Base are two organizations leading the effort for beaches near them.

Description
Measurements:

 Length: 5.9-6.7 in (15-17 cm)
 Weight: 1.1-2.0 oz (32.5-58 g)
 Wingspan: 13.4-17.0 in (34-43.2 cm)

Taxonomy
Genetic research published in 2009 strongly suggested that the snowy plover is a separate species from the Kentish plover, and by July, 2011, the International Ornithological Congress (IOC), and the American Ornithologists' Union (AOU) North American committee have recognized them as separate species. Other taxonomic committees are reviewing the relationship.

Physically, snowy plovers are shorter-legged, paler and greyer above than their Old World sister species, and breeding males lack a rufous cap. The eye mask is also poorly developed or absent.

Habitat and migration

The snowy plover breeds on sandy coasts and brackish inland lakes, and is uncommon on fresh water. It nests in a ground scrape and lays three to five eggs.

Breeding birds in warmer countries are largely sedentary, but northern and inland populations are migratory, wintering south to the tropics.

In North America, the snowy plover breeds from Texas and Oklahoma west to California and up the coastline to Oregon and Washington. The coastal form's primary breeding concentration is in central and southern California.

Diet
Coastal snowy plovers will hunt both close to the water's edge, as well as in drier, sandier areas. Inland birds favor damp, wetter environments. Food is typically obtained by a run-and-pause technique, though birds have been known to probe sand and chase insects near carcasses. The species primarily feeds on invertebrates, such as crustaceans, worms, beetles, and especially flies.

Threats and conservation efforts 
On March 5, 1993 the western snowy plover was listed as a threatened species under the Endangered Species Act of 1973. As of June 19, 2012, the habitat along the California, Oregon, and Washington Coasts have been listed as critical. In 2016, risk assessments by the IUCN listed the snowy plover as near threatened and found that the species had an overall decreasing population trend.  In many parts of the world, it has become difficult for this species to breed on beaches because of disturbance from the activities of humans or their animals.

University of California, Santa Barbara 
The University of California, Santa Barbara (UCSB) is currently endeavoring to rehabilitate snowy plover populations by protecting beaches along the central California coastline that runs along part of the university campus. UCSB has had some success in encouraging reproduction; the university also often trains students and other volunteers to watch over protected beaches during the daytime to ensure no one disturbs nesting grounds. But even with the conservation efforts, their population is slowly dwindling, it's estimated that only about 2,500 western snowy plovers breed along the Pacific Coast.

Vandenberg Space Force Base, California 
The beaches lining Vandenberg Space Force Base on the Central coast of California are also home to several protected areas where breeding has been successful in recent years.  Access to these beaches is limited to certain times of the year, and very specific areas are open to keep the bird protected.  Most of these beaches are only open to military personnel and their families.

References

Bibliography
 
 
Kaufman, Kenn. “Snowy Plover.” Audubon, 15 Jan. 2020, www.audubon.org/field-guide/bird/snowy-plover.

External links

 Western Snowy Plover - Tools and Resources for Recovery
 
 
 
 
 
 
 
 

snowy plover
snowy plover
Birds of the United States
Birds of Central America
Birds of Hispaniola
Birds of the Dominican Republic
Western South American coastal birds
Fauna of the San Francisco Bay Area
snowy plover
snowy plover